Shakhrisabz (: "city of green" / "verdant city") is a district-level city in Qashqadaryo Region in southern Uzbekistan. The Economic Cooperation Organization (ECO) has selected Shakhrisabz as its tourism capital for 2024.

It is located approximately 80 km south of Samarkand, at an altitude of 622 m. Its population is 140,500 (2021). Historically known as Kesh or Kish, Shahrisabz was once a major city of Central Asia and was an important urban center of Sogdiana, a province of the Achaemenid Empire of Persia. It is primarily known today as the birthplace of 14th-century Turco-Mongol conqueror Timur.

History 

Formerly known as Kesh or Kish ("heart-pleasing") and tentatively identified with the ancient Nautaca, Shahrisabz is one of Central Asia’s most ancient cities. It was founded more than 2,700 years ago and formed a part of the Achaemenid Empire or Persia from the 6th to 4th centuries BC. Throughout this period Kesh remained an important urban center of Sogdiana, a major province within the Empire. Documents from the late Achaemenid period speak of the renovation of the city's walls. It has been known as Shahrisabz since the Timurid era.

Alexander the Great's general Ptolemy captured the satrap of Bactria and pretender to the Persian throne, Bessus, at Nautaca thus ending the once great Achaemenid Empire. Alexander the Great chose to spend his winters and met his wife Roxanna in the area in 328-327 BC. Between 567 and 658 AD rulers of Kesh paid taxes to khagans of Turkic and Western Turkic khaganates. In 710 the city was conquered by the Arabs and following the Mongol conquest of Khwarezmia in the 13th century, the region came under the control of the Barlas tribe, all of whose lineages seem to have been associated with this region.

The birthplace of Timur
Kesh was the birthplace of Timur in 1336, to the family of a minor local Barlas chief, and during the early years of the Timurid dynasty, the city enjoyed his considerable patronage. Timur regarded Kesh as his “home town” and planned it eventually to be the location of his tomb. However, during his reign, the center of activity shifted to Samarkand instead. In the era of Timur, masterpieces of world architecture were built: the Ak-Saray palace, the Dorusiodat memorial complex. 
The city struggled for autonomy under Bukharan rule and the Russians helped the Bukharan emir conquering the city in 1870.

Historical sites  

Several remaining impressive monuments from the Timurid dynasty have enabled the old part of the city to be inscribed on the UNESCO World Heritage List. However, destruction of vast areas of the medieval townscape in 2015 to create a park and tourist facilities have led to concern from UNESCO. It is possible that the listing could be lost.

 Ak-Saray Palace

Timur's Summer Palace, the “White Palace” was planned as the most grandiose of all Timur's constructions. It was started in 1380 by artisans deported by Timur from the recently conquered Khwarezm. Unfortunately, only parts of its gigantic 65 m gate-towers survive, with blue, white and gold mosaics. Above the entry of the Ak-Saray are big letters saying: "If you challenge our power – look at our buildings!"

 Kok Gumbaz Mosque / Dorut Tilovat (Dorut Tilavat) Complex

A Friday mosque built in 1437 by Ulugh Beg in honor of his father Shah Rukh, its name meaning “Blue Dome”. Located immediately behind the Kok Gumbaz Mosque is the so-called “House of Meditation”, a mausoleum built by Ulugh Beg in 1438 but apparently never used for burials.

 Hazrat-i Imam Complex

East of the Kok Gumbaz is another mausoleum complex called Dorus-Saodat (Seat of Power and Might), which contains the Tomb of Jehangir, Timur's eldest and favorite son. The adjacent mosque is said to house the tomb of a revered 8th century imam Amir Kulal.

 Tomb of Timur

Behind the Hazrat-i Imam Emsemble is a bunker with a door leading to an underground chamber, discovered by archaeologists in 1943. The room is nearly filled with a single stone casket, on which inscriptions indicate that it was intended for Timur. However, the conqueror was buried in Samarkand, not at Shahrisabz, and mysteriously, his tomb in Shahrisabz contained two unidentified corpses.

Also of interest are medieval baths and an 18th-century bazaar.

Shahrisabz Museum of History and Material Culture

In popular culture 
In 1980s the Uzbek Soviet band Yalla wrote a song about Shahrisabz.

See also 
List of World Heritage Sites in Uzbekistan

References

External links 

 History and monuments of Shahrisabz
 Square Kufic decoration on Timur's Summer Palace
 Square Kufic decoration on the Dar al-Siyadah Complex
 Square Kufic decoration on the Dar al-Tilavah Complex
 

 
Populated places in Qashqadaryo Region
Cities in Uzbekistan
Archaeological sites in Uzbekistan
World Heritage Sites in Uzbekistan
Sogdian cities